The Women's individual event of the Biathlon World Championships 2013 was held on February 13, 2013. 118 athletes participated over a course of 15 km.

Results
The race was started at 17:15.

References

Women's individual
2013 in Czech women's sport